I Nyoman Masriadi (born 1973) is a painter and a leading artist of the post-Suharto era in Indonesia. His works have gained a collectors base which includes prominent collectors in and around the region.

Biography
Masriadi was born 1973, in Gianyar, Bali. Masriadi received his training in art at the Indonesian Institute of the Arts, Yogyakarta (ISI).

Work
In Bali, where he was born, there were two traditions of painting - a sacred one and one of words for a Western audience - but his relationship to these is indirect. Masriadi received his training in art at the Institute Seni Indonesia (ISI) Yogyakarta. From the time he was an art student, he had already been recognized by peers as one of the first contemporary Balinese artists who eased himself away from an encompassing concern with Balinese life, culture and traditions in his works. He is reputed to have stood in front of the canvas on a cardboard box to restrict himself from any distractions and fidgety behavior; to learn the skill of painting.

The visual imagery and narratives in his paintings are derived from keen and intelligent observations of social life and behavioural traits. His visual vocabulary is striking, continuously refreshing and contemporaneously relevant. Early works show him sparring with Western modernism in the guise of cubism but meshing it with caricature, the language of street advertising and graffiti. The way he has overdrawn his finished paintings with a marker can best be seen as a means of inscribing himself in or against that tradition.

"Masriadi: Black Is My Last Weapon" was the artist's maiden solo show at the Singapore Art Museum which was co organised by Gajah Gallery in 2008. The exhibit spanned Masriadi's 10-year career and explored the evolution of his signature black-skinned figures, a motif now widely copied by other Indonesian painters.

Masriadi's works are marked by consistent high quality — thoughtful in the messages that transmit from scenes and figures in his pictorial world, and painstakingly detailed in execution and finish. These qualities have led him to receive positive reception from the art collecting world at large. He is Southeast Asia's most well-received contemporary artist at auctions; the appreciation of his works is a testimony to his forte and talent as a painter as well as a barometer of the ascendency of Southeast Asian contemporary art.

Awards and accolades
He was awarded the prize for Best Painting at the Dies Natalis ISI Yogyakarta in 1997. He has participated in group exhibitions in Australia and the Netherlands, and in Indonesia: In Bali, Singapore, Jakarta, Mungkid (Magelang), Solo, Surabaya and Yogyakarta.

Masriadi is one of Southeast Asia's most well-received contemporary artists at auction.

Exhibitions

Selected solo exhibitions

Selected group exhibitions

Notable works

The Man From Bantul (The Final Round)

Sotheby's (Hong Kong): Final Price HK$7,82 million, or US$1,000,725.
The sale of this work, a triptych conveying the resolve of the human spirit, marked a record for a contemporary Southeast Asian art piece at auction. It sold for about five times its estimated price.

Attack from Website
This painstakingly rendered commentary on the art world and art practices of the 21st century sold for US$935,844 at Christie's Hong Kong as a lot in their Asian 20th Century and Contemporary Art (Evening Sale) on May 25, 2013.

Fatman

At Christie's first auction in Shanghai, Masriadi's mixed-media piece Fatman, was sold for US$757,547, the highest price ever paid for a similar sized work of the artist.

Jago Kandang (Home Champion)

Sotheby's (Singapore): Final Price US$370,668.

Placed into the social and political context of Masriadi's home country of Indonesia, it however simultaneously conveys a deeper story as he captures both the spirit and psyche of today's society. The emotions that are demonstrated by the football fans in the background–on the far right, anger; elsewhere, cheering supporters waving the national flag and banners carrying the words "Indonesia"–are indicative of Masriadi's cultural sensitivity and sharp humour.

'Jago Kandang' is ranked No.1 in Sotheby's Top Ten Contemporary Southeast Asian Paintings according to C-Arts Asian Contemporary Arts and Culture Magazine, Vol.03 2008.

Jangan Tanya Saya Tanya Presiden (Don't Ask Me, Ask The President)

One painting by Indonesian artist Nyoman Masriadi was expected to sell for up to $25,000 (in 2007). In the end, a Southeast Asian collector paid SGD$360,000 (HK$1,854,000) for it, setting a world record price for a Masriadi painting.

Publications

Nyoman Masriadi: Recent Paintings, April 7 - May 14, 2011
Paul Kasmin Gallery catalog, presented in collaboration with Gajah Gallery. 
Essay by Benjamin Gennochio.

Nyoman Masriadi-Reconfiguring the Body
 

Despite Masriadi's contribution to and influence on Indonesian art there has not been, until this book, much written discussion of his work. This is long overdue. Nyoman Masriadi- Reconfiguring the Body brings a much needed intellectual discourse to Masriadi's work. That it has come together with such clarity and depth of expression can be attributed to two years of hard work by the author-editor, T.K.Sabapathy. His efforts to access first hand photos, articles and various bits of information have resulted in a thorough consideration of the evolution of Masriadi's art practice. Goenawan Mohamad uncovers the local complexities and richness of contemporary Indonesian society and experience. No writer is better able to lend such elegance to that most difficult of tasks - unlocking the culture, language and voice of artists in Indonesia.

Masriadi: Black Is My Last Weapon

Singapore Art Museum presented Masriadi: Black is My Last Weapon in collaboration with Gajah Gallery which featured over 30 works completed in the past decade. It was published on the occasion of the Masriadi: Black is My Last Weapon exhibition from 22 August to 9 November 2008. Presented by curators Seng Yu Jin and Wang Zineng in four thematic sections, with each theme serving as a weapon, in the sense of an apparatus for engagement, to the interior world of the artist.

Group exhibition postcard set

A set of 15 postcards were designed as a commemorative piece for Gajah Gallery's 15th year anniversary celebration. The set is a compilation of work by Ahmad Zakii Anwar, J. Ariadhitya Pramuhendra, Jumaldi Alfi, M. Irfan, Mangu Putra, Nyoman Masriadi, Teng Nee Cheong and Yunizar.

Selected press
 Barnaby, Martin, "Master of his own mythology," Financial Times, 5/17/13.
 Genocchio, Benjamin, "Is Jakarta the Next Art Market Capital?," Artinfo, 5/4/13.
 Kinsella, Eileen, "Nyoman Masriadi's Dark Satire of Indonesian Culture Finds A Global Audience," Artinfo, 3/2/13.

See also
 Fendry Ekel

References

External links 
 I Nyoman Masriadi's Official Website

1973 births
Living people
20th-century Indonesian painters
Artists from Bali
People from Gianyar Regency